Houston Christian High School (HCHS) is a private, non-profit, coeducational, Christian day school which educates students in grades 9–12. HC is accredited by a member of the National Association of Independent Schools, and the Independent Schools Association of the Southwest. It is a  campus located in Spring Branch in western Houston, Texas, at the intersection of Beltway 8 and Kempwood Drive, inside Beltway 8 and outside Interstate 610.

History
Houston Christian High School was founded in 1970 under the name Northwest Academy. The city of Houston's extension of a street to the new school was cited as an example of government aid to a segregation academy.

In 1998, Northwest Academy (K-12) split into First Baptist Academy and Houston Christian High School. Multiple churches collectively cofounded Houston Christian to cater to residents of the western portions of Greater Houston. First Baptist Academy moved to a location next to Houston First Baptist Church, and Houston Christian remained at the Northwest Academy site until its current facility opened. In turn the British School of Houston occupied the former Northwest Academy/Houston Christian site.

In fall 1998 Houston Christian began operations. Metro National Corp. sold the land, for under $4,000,000, to a group that intended to use the land for the permanent Houston Christian location. The cost of building was, in 1998, thought to be approximately $20 million. Construction was to begin in 1999. The school opened in the beginning of the school year in 2000. The following year multiple classrooms, a chapel, and the fine arts facilities were scheduled to open. The ultimate cost was $11 million.

Student enrollment increased from 155 in 1998 to 338 in 2001.

Circa 2018, the school decided to create a fine arts endowment from a donation worth $1,000,000.

Campus
It is along Beltway 8 and Kempwood Drive. It is in proximity to Spring Shadows. The George and Barbara Bush Center for Scholars and Leaders is a program located on campus that opened in 2012. The center offers courses for students to learn leadership skills and each student at the school receives at least 30 hours of leadership training.

The original campus had  of area.

References

External links
 

Independent Schools Association of the Southwest
Private high schools in Harris County, Texas
Private high schools in Houston
Educational institutions established in 1998
Christian schools in Houston
Segregation academies in Texas
Spring Branch, Houston
1998 establishments in Texas